Helvig of Schleswig (also erroneously Hedwig; 1320–1374) was the queen of Denmark as the spouse of King Valdemar IV. She was the mother of Queen Margaret I of Denmark.

Life 
Helvig was the daughter of Eric II, Duke of Schleswig, and Adelaide of Holstein-Rendsburg, and the sister of Valdemar V, Duke of Schleswig. Her date of birth is not known, but she and her brother were children at the time of her father's death in 1325, and she is estimated to have been born in around the year 1320.

Her brother had contended the Danish throne (as Valdemar III of Denmark) with King Christopher II of Denmark, and was the king of Denmark, from 1326 to 1329, under the guardianship of their maternal uncle, Gerhard III, Count of Holstein-Rendsburg. In the late 1330s, her brother made an alliance with King Christopher's son, Valdemar IV, against his uncle Gerhard, and arranged a marriage between Helvig and Valdemar IV in connection to this. She was to bring the pawned province of Nørrejylland, one quarter of the territory of Jutland north of the Kongeå river, as a dowry. The wedding took place at Sønderborg Castle in 1340. After the wedding, the couple traveled to Viborg to be officially greeted as king and queen of Denmark.

There is little information about queen Helvig. She is not mentioned to have been politically active or as having played any personal role in any aspect: she would, for example had been expected to serve as regent during Valdemar's pilgrimage in 1346, but there is no mention that she did. Until the birth of the future Margaret I of Denmark in 1353, she is noted as living with Valdemar, but after that year, she is no longer documented to be living with him.

A traditional theory was that king Valdemar had queen Helvig repudiated and imprisoned with her household at Søborg Castle for adultery. This theory was based on an old folk song, which described the love affair between the queen and a knight. This story is not confirmed. Another theory claims, that it was queen Helvig who separated from king Valdemar because of his adultery with his mistress Tove, and that she moved to Esrum Abbey in 1355. None of these theories have ever been confirmed, and the truth of their separation is unknown.

Helvig is confirmed to have lived separate from Valdemar at Esrum Abbey, where she eventually died as a lay sister, noted by the monks as famula nostra ('our servant'). She was buried in the abbey church, which brought royal gifts of property for the abbey. A year after her death, her spouse died and her daughter became regent of Denmark. In 1377, queen Margaret successfully asked the pope for permission to rebury her mother at Sorø, though this plan was never realized.

Children 
Helvig and Valdemar IV had at least six children;

 Christopher, Duke of Lolland (1344–1363)
 Margaret (1345–1350); betrothed to Henry III, Duke of Mecklenburg-Schwerin
 Ingeborg (1347–1370); married Henry III, Duke of Mecklenburg-Schwerin, and was the maternal grandmother of King Eric VII of Denmark
 Catherine (1349); died young
 Valdemar (1350); died young
 Margaret I of Denmark (1353–1412)

References 
 Alf Henrikson: Dansk historia (Danish history) (1989) (Swedish)
 Sven Rosborn (In Swedish): När hände vad i Nordens historia (When did what happen in the historiy of the Nordic countries) (1997)
 https://web.archive.org/web/20161122000742/http://www.xn--nstvedhistorie-0ib.dk/dronning_helvig.pdf
 Dansk Biografisk Leksikon, 1933–34

	

Danish royal consorts
1374 deaths
Valdemar IV of Denmark
14th-century Danish nuns
Year of birth unknown
Helvig
Place of birth unknown
Place of death unknown
Daughters of monarchs